Burnwell is an unincorporated community in Kanawha County, West Virginia, United States.

The community originally was a coal-mining community, hence the name Burnwell.

References

Unincorporated communities in Kanawha County, West Virginia
Unincorporated communities in West Virginia
Coal towns in West Virginia